Steve Moses (born 1989) is an American ice hockey player.

Steve or Stephen Moses may also refer to:

 Stephen Moses (born 1954), American musician